Lioprosopa adenocera is a species of snout moth in the genus Lioprosopa. It was originally described by Turner in 1923, as a species of Lioprosopa. It is known from Australia.

References

Moths described in 1923
Anerastiini